Events from the year 1815 in Russia

Incumbents
 Monarch – Alexander I

Events

  
 
  
  
 His Imperial Majesty's Own Chancellery
 
  Quadruple Alliance (1815)
 Lazarev Institute of Oriental Languages
 Mir yeshiva (Belarus)

Births

Deaths

References

1815 in Russia
Years of the 19th century in the Russian Empire